Matthew Duncan Abeysinghe, OLY (born 19 March 1996) is a competitive swimmer who has represented Sri Lanka at numerous international competitions, including the 2016 and 2020 Olympics in Rio de Janeiro and Tokyo respectively. Abeysinghe trained under his coach and father, Manoj Abeysinghe, with Killer Whale Aquatics, until his departure for higher education, where he resumed his training at Ohio State University in the US. Abeysinghe is regarded as the greatest swimmer and one of the most accomplished athletes Sri Lanka has ever produced.

Career
Abeysinghe started swimming when he was three years old alongside his elder brother, Andrew. He has been quoted, saying he started swimming merely for water safety, not to compete. Over the course of his career, Abeysinghe has achieved numerous accolades, including; international medals, national records, national championships, and several national awards. Abeysinghe is considered the greatest athlete in South Asian Games history. He is also the most decorated; winning a total of 14 gold medals, two silver medals, and one bronze medal. In Freestyle, his most proficient stroke, Abeysinghe holds all of the national records except for the 200m Freestyle, which belongs to his younger brother, Kyle. He also holds the South Asian record in the 100m and 200m Freestyle events. 

Abeysinghe's first time representing Sri Lanka was at 2010 Commonwealth Games in Delhi, India. There he broke the national record in the 400m Freestyle, previously held by Julian Bolling and became the youngest male swimmer to be selected to the national team. Later on that year, he competed at the 2010 FINA World Swimming Championships in Dubai. In 2011, Abeysinghe represented Sri Lanka three times; at the 2011 World Aquatics Championships, the 2011 Youth Commonwealth Games, in the Isle of Man, making it to the finals of the 400m Freestyle, and Asian Age Group Swimming Championships, where he won the silver medal in 100m Freestyle. In 2012 Abeysinghe competed at the 2012 FINA World Swimming Championships in Istanbul, Turkey. The next year, Abeysinghe competed at the 2013 Asian Youth Games, where he won the bronze medal in the 100m Freestyle, becoming the first Sri Lankan to win a medal at an Asian Games event.

In 2014, at the 2014 Summer Youth Olympics, Abeysinghe competed in the 100m Freestyle. After setting a national record in prelims, he advanced to the semi-final, where he raced amongst the likes of future Olympians; Duncan Scott and Kyle Chalmers. 

Later on, he represented Sri Lanka at the 2014 FINA World Swimming Championships in Doha, Qatar. He also competed in the 2014 Asian Indoor Athletics Championships in Seoul, Korea. In 2015, Abeysinghe competed at the 2015 FINA World Championships in Kazan, Russia. Competing at the Hong Kong Age Group Championships, Matthew achieved the "B" qualifying time for the 2016 Olympic Games, becoming the first and only Sri Lankan swimmer, and one of few athletes, to achieve this feat up to that point (his younger brother, Kyle, managed to surpass this mark later on). Abeysinghe competed at the 2016 Summer Olympics in Rio De Janeiro, Brazil, alongside fellow swimming star, Kimiko Raheem. He competed in the 100m Freestyle, with a time of 50.96. 

In early 2017, Abeysinghe moved to the US to attend Ohio State University. There he resumed training, after a prolonged leg injury in late 2016.

At the 2018 Commonwealth Games in Gold Coast, Australia, Abeysinghe was a part of the 4×100 Freestyle relay for Sri Lanka. Alongside him was his younger brother Kyle, Akalanka Pieris and Cherantha De Silva. Together, they became the first Sri Lankan team to make finals at the Commonwealth Games. Unfortunately, due to an early start by De Silva, they were disqualified. At the Games, he also competed in the 50m and 100m Freestyle, qualifying for the semi-final in the latter. There he competed against the likes of Cameron McEvoy, Chad Le Clos, and Benjamin Proud. He also became the first Sri Lankan to break the "50-second" barrier. 

Later on that year, he competed at the 2018 Asian Games in Jakarta, Indonesia. Again, he was a part of the 4×100m Freestyle relay team alongside his brother Kyle, Akalanka Pieris and Cherantha De Silva. He also competed in the 50m and 100m Freestyle events, qualifying for the semifinal in both. A serious medal contender in the 100m Freestyle, Abeysinghe was unable to stand atop the podium, placing 5th. 

Abeysinghe also competed in the 100m freestyle event at the 2020 Summer Olympics in Tokyo.

2016 South Asian Games
With seven gold medals, two silver and one bronze (10 medals at 11 events) in 2016 South Asian Games, Abeysinghe broke the record for most gold medals in South Asian Games by a Sri Lankan, previously set by Julian Bolling back in 1991 South Asian Games. With this feat Matthew became the highest gold medal winner at a single SAG in any sport from any country!

2016 Summer Olympics
Abeysinghe is the first swimmer ever to qualify under the Olympic Standard(B) to represent Sri Lanka in the 2016 Rio Olympic Games from 5 to 22 August.

2018 Commonwealth Games
In February 2018, Abeysinghe was named to Sri Lanka's 2018 Commonwealth Games team. In the 50 and 100 meter Freestyle events he reached the semi-final recording a top 20 time in the world for the 100m freestyle. He was placed 10th and 14th, respectively. His time of 49.11 in the 100 Freestyle was an Ohio State University record and he became the 1st Sri Lankan to break the 50 second barrier. Along with his teammates he reached the finals in the 4 × 100 m freestyle relay, placing 8th in prelims and recording a time of 3:22.84, shattering the National and SAF record.

2019 South Asian Games
Matthew continued his golden run at the South Asian Games and repeated his feat from the 2016 edition, winning 7 gold and a silver in the 2019 South Asian Games held in Kathmandu Nepal.

2020 Summer Olympics
Abeysinghe overcame training challenges due to COVID and competed in the 50 and 100 Freestyle events at the postponed Summer Olympics in Tokyo in 2021.

Personal life
Matthew Abeysinghe is from Colombo, Sri Lanka. He was born in the USA and started his swimming career there. Matthew had a great start where he was top 5 in the US Top 16 classification as a 8 year old and was placed 1st in the 50 Butterfly. He joined the Swim America program and Killer Whale Aquatics when it was launched in 2012. He then joined Asian International School Colombo, subsequently moving to the US for higher education and training at The Ohio State University. In Sri Lanka he was coached by his father Manoj Abeysinghe, at the Killer Whale Aquatics in Sri Lanka. His family is well known for their swimming prowess in the sporting community of Sri Lanka. He has three brothers, one elder and two younger, all of whom are swimmers. His elder brother, Andrew Abeysinghe, is a former national champion, national record holder, and multiple South Asian Games gold medalist. Dillon Abeysinghe, his younger brother, is a former national champion, national record holder, and South Asian Aquatic Championship medalist. His youngest brother, Kyle Abeysinghe, is a two-time silver medalist at the Youth Commonwealth Games, one of few Sri Lankan athletes, and only swimmer, to ever achieve such a feat. At the South Asian Games level he is a gold medalist and South Asian Games record holder. At the domestic level he is also a national record holder and national champion. Their father, Manoj Abeysinghe is their coach and the four brother's hold the 4x50 Medley Relay national record. Mathew trained out of the CR&FC's swimming pool in Colombo, and his team Killer Whale Aquatics is a dominant force in the local swimming arena, where they have won the men's national championship on 5 consecutive years since 2015 and the women's national championship on 5 occasions as well.

National and international awards
 Winner Ada Derana Sri Lankan of the Year for sports in 2016.
 Winner Most Outstanding Sportsman of the Year 2016 – Presidential Sports Award

Achievements

SAF records

Sri Lanka Long Course national records

See also
List of Sri Lankans by sport

References

External links 
 

1996 births
Living people
Sri Lankan male swimmers
Olympic swimmers of Sri Lanka
Swimmers at the 2014 Summer Youth Olympics
Swimmers at the 2016 Summer Olympics
Swimmers at the 2020 Summer Olympics
Commonwealth Games competitors for Sri Lanka
Swimmers at the 2010 Commonwealth Games
Swimmers at the 2018 Commonwealth Games
Asian Games competitors for Sri Lanka
Swimmers at the 2018 Asian Games
South Asian Games medalists in swimming
South Asian Games gold medalists for Sri Lanka
South Asian Games silver medalists for Sri Lanka
South Asian Games bronze medalists for Sri Lanka
Swimmers from Colombo
Swimmers from Pennsylvania
People from Hazleton, Pennsylvania
Ohio State Buckeyes men's swimmers